Huddersfield Town's 1988–89 campaign was a fairly unsuccessful campaign following the disastrous relegation the previous season. Under the leadership of former Ireland manager Eoin Hand, a disastrous end to the season saw Town finish 14th, just 6 points and 7 places above the relegation zone, despited the 33 goals from Craig Maskell.

Squad at the start of the season

Review
Following the disastrous campaign orchestrated by Steve Smith and Malcolm Macdonald the previous season, it was up to former Ireland manager Eoin Hand and assistant Peter Withe to try to recover Town's perilous position in the 3rd tier of English football. At the start of the season, Town seemed to register a loss and a win every alternate week. Although new signing Craig Maskell (bought using the money funded by the sale of Duncan Shearer during the close-season.) started to score the goals that would try to bring Town up to the play-off spots.

The season did not bring much joy to the Town fans probably still reeling from relegation the previous season, although Town did bring some joy with some good results during January and February, as well as a narrow defeat by soon-to-be promoted Sheffield United in the FA Cup restored some pride to the beleaguered fans.

Also during the season Town recorded their biggest ever away league victory – a 6–0 thrashing of Bury at Gigg Lane. Bizarrely, Town would lose 6–0 at Bury the following season. In the last 7 games, Town lost 5 of them and drew the other 2. But, on a positive note, Craig Maskell broke a post-war goalscoring record of 32 goals set by Jimmy Glazzard in the 1954–55 season, by scoring his 33rd goal of the season in the last game of the season at home to Wigan Athletic.

Squad at the end of the season

Results

Division Three

FA Cup

League Cup

League Trophy

Appearances and goals

1988–89
1988–89 Football League Third Division by team